Pseudoclanis abyssinicus is a moth of the family Sphingidae first described by Hippolyte Lucas in 1857. It is known from Sudan and Ethiopia.

References

Pseudoclanis
Moths described in 1857
Insects of Ethiopia
Moths of Africa